His/Her Serene Highness (abbreviation: HSH, second person address: Your Serene Highness) is a style used today by the reigning families of Liechtenstein, Monaco and Thailand. Over the past 400 years, it has also used as a style for senior members of the family of Hazrat Ishaan, who lead Naqshbandi Sunni Islam and the Naqshbandi Sufi Order today. Until 1918, it was also associated with the princely titles of members of some German ruling and mediatised dynasties and with a few princely but non-ruling families. It was also the form of address used for cadet members of the dynasties of France, Italy, Russia and Ernestine Saxony, under their monarchies. Additionally, the treatment was granted for some, but not all, princely yet non-reigning families of Bohemia, Hungary, Italy, Poland, Romania and Russia by emperors or popes. In a handful of rare cases, it was employed by non-royal rulers in viceregal or even republican contexts.

In a number of older English dictionaries, serene as used in this context means supreme; royal; august; marked by majestic dignity or grandeur; or high or supremely dignified.

German-speaking lands
The current, legal usage of the style in the German-speaking countries is confined to the Princely Family of Liechtenstein, the entirety of which bears the treatment.

The German term is Durchlaucht, a translation of the Latin (su)perillustris. This is usually translated into English as Serene Highness, however, it would be more literal to translate it as superior to, above, beyond or greater than illustrious, as it is an augmentation of Erlaucht ("illustrious"), which was accorded to immediate counts (Reichsgrafen) of the Holy Roman Empire and by mediatised counts of the German Confederation and the German Empire. The 1911 edition of the Encyclopædia Britannica wryly observes that a perfectly logical English version might be "Your Transparency".

In 1375 Emperor Charles IV bestowed the nobiliary style Durchlauchtig upon the seven Prince-electors designated by the Golden Bull of 1356. As from 1664 Emperor Leopold I vested all Imperial Princes with the title, it became so common that the Electors like the Archdukes of Austria began to use the superlative address Durchlauchtigst. In the German Empire, the style of Serene Highness was usually held by princes of lower rank than those who were entitled to Highness (exceptions were the Wettin cadets of the Ernestine duchies), Grand Ducal Highness, Royal Highness, and Imperial Highness. Therefore, if a woman entitled to the treatment of Royal Highness married a man who was addressed only as Serene Highness, the woman usually retained her pre-marital style.

In 1905 Emperor Franz Joseph I of Austria granted the style of Durchlaucht to members of virtually every family which had held the title of prince in the former Holy Roman Empire, even if the family had never exercised sovereignty.

In the German and Austrian empires of the 19th and 20th centuries, the style Serene Highness was also officially borne by:
 Cadet branches of the sovereign Ernestine dukes (i.e., Saxe-Altenburg, Saxe-Meiningen, Saxe-Coburg and Gotha);
 Reigning Fürsten of the small German realms which survived the collapse of the Holy Roman Empire;
 Hohenzollern (yielded sovereignty to Hohenzollern kinsman, the King of Prussia, in 1848)
 Lippe
 Reuss
 Schaumburg-Lippe
 Schwarzburg 
 Waldeck and Pyrmont
 Mediatised princes (e.g., Fürstenberg, Hohenlohe, Leiningen, Thurn und Taxis) and dukes (e.g., Ratibor), and, eventually, their family members;
 Morganatic princes, descended from reigning dynasties;
 Other non-reigning princes of the German nobility, but not (always) their cadets (e.g., Bismarck, Carolath-Beuthen, Pless, Wrede).

By tradition, Durchlaucht is still attributed to the princely dynasties which were sovereign until 1917 or had been mediatised under the Austro-Hungarian Empire and German Confederation in 1815, although the usage has been unofficial since 1918.

N.B. The highest form of durchlauchtig (adjective) was allerdurchlauchtigst (absolutely most serene), which was reserved only to the Emperor in his style of address: Allerdurchlauchtigster Großmächtigster Allergnädigster Kaiser und Herr

Persian culture 
The general Persian equivalent of His Serene Highness would be the title "Ali Jah" (اعلى جاه), that was used in the Safavid Empire. Another specialized translation of His Serene Highness would be the hereditary title "Hazrat Ishaan" (حضرت ايشان) which is a title exclusively granted to Sayyid Khwaja Khawand Mahmud and passed on to the seniors of his family. Sayyid Khwaja Khawand Mahmud´s family is known for intermarrying with various royal families, like the Mughal Imperial and Barakzai Dynasty. In a heredity reaching Prophet Muhammad through their patriarch Sayyid Khwaja Khawand Mahmud they act as Imams of Naqshbandi Sunni Islam and supreme leaders of the Naqshbandi Sufi Order today. The Naqshbandi Sufi scholar Yaseen Qasvari hence notes, that the essence of this particular title is in light of a religious blessing derived from Prophet Muhammad.

Francophone dominions
There is some evidence that in pre-Revolutionary France, unlike Germany, one entitled to be addressed as Serene Highness was considered to outrank someone who was merely addressed as Highness. Those members of the royal family who weren't children or grandchildren of a king, i.e., the princes du sang, were entitled to be addressed as "Most Serene Highness" (son altesse sérénissime). The simple style of "Highness" (altesse) was claimed by the princes étrangers and the princes légitimés. In fact, these formal styles were seldom employed in conversation, since the princes du sang used unique styles (e.g. Mademoiselle, Monsieur le Prince), while the ducal peers, led by the proud Duc de Saint-Simon, avoided conceding the altesse to the princes étrangers and bâtards royaux, prompting nobles of lesser rank to do likewise.

The reigning Prince of Monaco, Albert II, is addressed as His Serene Highness. His wife, children and younger sister, Princess Stéphanie, are also referred to as Serene Highness. His elder sister, Princess Caroline, was also styled Her Serene Highness prior to her 1999 marriage, but is styled Royal Highness since then, even during the period when she was officially "The Hereditary Princess of Monaco" as heiress presumptive to the throne. A particularly well known holder of this style of address was Grace Kelly, who was titled, HSH The Princess of Monaco.  In French, both male and female versions are Son Altesse Sérénissime (S.A.S.), which translates, literally, as "His/Her Most Serene Highness".

Italy
In the Republic of Venice (697-1797), also called "the Most Serene Republic" , "la Serenìsima Repùblega" in Venetian ( "la Serenissima Repubblica" in Italian ), the Doge was known as Serenissimus ("Most Serene") as was the Duke of Mantua.

Children of the Savoy kings and crown princes of Italy were entitled to the treatment of Royal Highness, but more remote male-line descendants were Serene Highnesses by right (although often the style of Royal Highness was granted to them ad personam, e.g., the Dukes of Aosta or the Dukes of Genoa).

The mediatised House of Thurn and Taxis, entitled to the Serene Highness treatment in the German Empire, has a non-dynastic cadet branch, the Dukes di Castel Duino, which obtained naturalization in Italy in 1923. When incorporated into the Italian nobility, their use of the Serene Highness style was authorised by the Crown.

San Marino
San Marino is styled as the Most Serene Republic.

Poland
In the First Republic of Poland (1569-1795), also called "the Most Serene Republic of Poland" (Najjaśniejsza Rzeczpospolita Polska), His/Her Serene Reigning Majesty (SRM) was a style used by the reigning monarchs.

Russia
After 1886, great-grandchildren of Russian emperors in the male-line were Prince[ss] of Russia, and were to be granted the treatment of Highness, and Prince[ss] of Russia with the style of Serene Highness if being more distantly descended from an emperor, and born from an equal marriage (as opposed to Morganatic marriage). An exception was for each eldest son of senior imperial great-grandsons (in the patrilineal descent of each son of the emperor), who retained the higher style of Highness.

Strictly, the Russian term, Svetlost, was an honorific used in adjectival form (Светлейший: Svetleyshiy, Most Serene) to refer to members of a select few of Russia's princely families (e.g. "The Serene" Prince Anatoly Pavlovich Lieven or "The Serene" Prince Dmitri Vladimirovich Golitsyn). However, when translated into non-Slavic languages and used in reference to a member of the imperial Romanov family, it was usually rendered as Serene Highness.

United Kingdom
Queen Victoria elevated each of the princes who married her daughters to Royal Highness (except for Crown Prince Friedrich of Prussia, husband of Victoria, Princess Royal, who already possessed the HRH). This included, on 30 January 1884, HSH Prince Henry of Battenberg, husband of Princess Beatrice. That couple's children were granted the style of Highness by their British grandmother by letters patent 4 December 1886.

Several morganatic branches of reigning German dynasties took up residence in the United Kingdom in the 19th century, where their German princely titles and style of Serene Highness were recognized by the sovereign. Included in this group were Princess Edward of Saxe-Weimar, Princess Victor of Hohenlohe-Langenburg, the dukes and princes of Teck and the princes of Battenberg.

During World War I, King George V revoked recognition of the style Serene Highness, hitherto used by some relatives of the British Royal Family who used German princely titles but lived in Britain. George V's queen consort was born "Her Serene Highness Princess Mary of Teck", and Prince Philip's mother had been born "Her Serene Highness Princess Alice of Battenberg". The Tecks (descended from the royal House of Württemberg) and the Battenbergs (descended from the Grand Dukes of Hesse and by Rhine) were compensated with multiple peerages, viz. Marquess of Cambridge and Earl of Athlone for the former, and Marquess of Milford Haven and Marquess of Carisbrooke for the latter.

Belgium
The following titleholders or families are authorised by the Crown to use the style Serene Highness

Dukes and princes of Arenberg
Dukes of Beaufort-Spontin
Dukes and princes of Croÿ
Princes of Habsburg-Lorraine (archducal cadets resident in Belgium)
Princes of Lobkowicz (resident in Belgium)
Dukes and princes of Looz-Corswarem 
Princes of Stolberg-Stolberg
Prince   of Waterloo

Hungary
Before 1947, the style His/Her Serene Highness (Őfőméltósága, literally: "His/Her High Dignity") was in use in Hungary. Peers with the title of prince were entitled to it, and between 1920 and 1944  the regent, Miklós Horthy, was styled as His Serene Highness the Regent of the Kingdom of Hungary (Őfőméltósága, a Magyar Királyság kormányzója).

Portugal
As the most powerful noble family in Portugal, the Dukes of Braganza had the official treatment of Serene Highness until 1640, when they mounted the Portuguese throne, thereby becoming entitled to the style of Royal Highness, however the infantes not in direct line for the throne of Portugal were titled as "His/Her Highness, the Serene Infante(a)".

Mexico
From 1853 to 1855 the president of Mexico, Antonio Lopez de Santa Anna, enjoyed the official style of Most Serene Highness, a treatment unique in that country.

Agustin I de Mexico gave that title to several members of his family.

Spain
In 1807 Manuel de Godoy, Prince de la Paz, was accorded the style of Most Serene Highness, a treatment unique in that country at the time. Previous to this grant the style was sometimes used by the Catholic Monarch Isabella and Ferdinand as well as by other houses known anciently as illustrious or serene. A majority of these ancient houses lost the style through prescription.

The honorific is one of the styles of the infantes.

Thailand
In Thailand, the title of Serene Highness is the westernized style of the Thai title of Mom Chao (His/Her Serene Highness Prince/Princess | Thai: หม่อมเจ้า), denoting the grandchild of a king through one of his princely sons. In present-day Thailand, there are very few Mom Chao left after the royal family discontinued the traditional practice of polygamous marriages, and in Thailand all royal titles and styles decrease one level every generation for those not of the immediate royal family. Therefore, the child of a Mom Chao would only have the aristocratic title of Mom Rajawongse, which would then decrease in the next generation to Mom Luang, which would then decrease further, similar to a British life peerage.

See also 
 Style (manner of address)
 Most Serene Republic
 SAS (novel series), named after Son Altesse Sérénissime, French version of the honorific.

Notes

External links 
 Article on the use of Highness

Royal styles